Robert C. Huntley Jr. (born August 7, 1932) is an American politician who was the Democratic nominee for Governor of Idaho in 1998. An attorney in Boise, he served on the Idaho Supreme Court from 1982 to 1989.

Biography
Huntley graduated from the University of Idaho with a Bachelor of Science in 1954 and a Juris Doctor in 1959. He received a Master of Laws from the University of Virginia in 1988.

Huntley entered politics in 1962, serving on the Pocatello City Council until 1964, including a term as mayor. He served a term in the Idaho House of Representatives from 1965 until 1967, as well as on the Idaho Supreme Court from 1982 until 1989.

In the 1998 gubernatorial election, Huntley defeated three other candidates to win the Democratic primary with 54% of the vote. He lost the general election to Republican Dirk Kempthorne with 29% of the vote.

References

1932 births
Living people
Idaho lawyers
Idaho city council members
Mayors of places in Idaho
Democratic Party members of the Idaho House of Representatives
Justices of the Idaho Supreme Court
People from Pocatello, Idaho
People from Boise, Idaho
University of Idaho alumni
University of Virginia School of Law alumni